Little Shop of Horrors is a 1986 American horror comedy musical film directed by Frank Oz. It is an adaptation of the 1982 off-Broadway musical of the same name by composer Alan Menken and writer Howard Ashman, which is itself an adaptation of the 1960 film The Little Shop of Horrors by director Roger Corman. The film, which centers on a floral shop worker who discovers a sentient carnivorous plant that feeds on human blood, stars Rick Moranis, Ellen Greene, Vincent Gardenia, Steve Martin, and the voice of Levi Stubbs. The film also features special appearances by Jim Belushi, John Candy, Christopher Guest and Bill Murray. It was produced by David Geffen through The Geffen Company and released by Warner Bros. on December 19, 1986.

Little Shop of Horrors was filmed on the Albert R. Broccoli 007 Stage at the Pinewood Studios in England, where a "downtown" set, complete with overhead train track, was constructed. Produced on a budget of $25 million, in contrast to the original 1960 film, which, according to Corman, only cost $30,000, it was well received by critics and audiences alike, eventually developing a cult following. The film's original 23-minute finale, based on the musical's ending, was rewritten and reshot after test audiences did not react positively to it. For years only available as black-and-white workprint footage, the original ending was fully restored in 2012 by Warner Home Video and a director's cut was released.

Plot

In the early 1960s, a three-girl "Greek chorus" – Crystal, Ronette, and Chiffon – introduce the film, warning the audience that some horror is coming their way ("Prologue: Little Shop of Horrors"). Seymour Krelborn and his co-worker, Audrey, work at Mushnik's Flower Shop in New York City's rough, rundown Skid Row neighborhood, which they lament that they cannot escape ("Skid Row (Downtown)"). Struggling from a lack of customers, Mr. Mushnik decides to close the store, but Audrey suggests he may have more success by displaying an unusual plant that Seymour owns. Immediately attracting a customer, Seymour explains he bought the plant – which he dubbed "Audrey II" – from a Chinese flower shop during a solar eclipse ("Da-Doo"). The plant brings much business to Mushnik's shop, but soon starts to wither. Seymour accidentally pricks his finger, and discovers that Audrey II needs human blood to thrive ("Grow for Me").

Audrey II begins to grow rapidly, making Seymour a local celebrity. Meanwhile, Audrey suffers at the hands of her sadistic biker boyfriend, Orin Scrivello; however, she has feelings for Seymour and secretly dreams of running off with him to the suburbs ("Somewhere That's Green"). Seymour continues to feed Audrey II his own blood, draining his energy ("Some Fun Now"). He attempts to ask Audrey out, but she turns him down because she has a date with Orin, who is revealed to be a dentist ("Dentist!"). After Seymour closes up shop, Audrey II begins to talk to Seymour, demanding more blood than Seymour can give. The plant suggests that Seymour murder someone, promising that it will bring him fame and fortune and will impress Audrey. Seymour initially refuses, but eventually agrees after he witnesses Orin abusing Audrey ("Feed Me (Git It!)").

After Orin finishes with his masochistic patient, Arthur Denton, who had requested "a long, slow, root canal", Seymour draws a revolver on Orin, but cannot bring himself to use it. Orin, who abuses nitrous oxide, puts on a type of venturi mask to receive a constant flow of the gas, but breaks the valve, and Seymour watches as he asphyxiates. Seymour dismembers Orin's body and feeds it to Audrey II, which has grown to enormous size, but is unknowingly witnessed by Mushnik, who flees in fear.

Audrey, feeling guilty over Orin's disappearance, is comforted by Seymour and the two admit their feelings for each other ("Suddenly, Seymour"). That night, Mushnik confronts Seymour about Orin's death. He holds Seymour at gunpoint, demanding the plant for his own silence. Backed into a corner, Seymour begins to tell him how to care for Audrey II but before he can reveal the secret, the plant swallows Mushnik whole ("Suppertime").

Despite widespread success, Seymour worries about Audrey II's growth and unbridled appetite. Offered money and a contract for a botany TV show, Seymour becomes overwhelmed and decides to escape Skid Row with Audrey using money coming the next day, and leaving the plant to starve. After Audrey accepts Seymour's marriage proposal, Audrey II catches Seymour leaving and demands another meal: Seymour agrees, but insists on meat from a butcher. While Seymour is gone, the plant telephones Audrey, coaxes her into the shop, and then tries to eat her ("Suppertime II").

Seymour, returning in time to save Audrey, escapes the store with her. Explaining that he fed the plant to become successful and win Audrey's heart, Seymour discovers she has always loved him ("Suddenly, Seymour" (reprise)). Approached by an executive named Patrick Martin from a botanical company, Seymour is offered a contract to breed Audrey II and sell the saplings worldwide. Horrified by the idea, Seymour drives Martin away and realizes he must destroy Audrey II for the sake of humanity.

Returning to the shop, Seymour learns that Audrey II is actually an alien from outer space ("Mean Green Mother from Outer Space"). Audrey II traps Seymour and destroys the shop. Seymour grabs an exposed electrical cable in the rubble and electrocutes Audrey II, resulting in an explosion. Leaving the destroyed shop, Seymour safely reunites with Audrey. The two wed and move to the suburbs. As they arrive at their new home, a smiling Audrey II bud can be seen among the flowers in their front yard.

Cast
 Rick Moranis as Seymour Krelborn, a nerdy florist who loves "strange and interesting" plants. He is nice and well-intentioned, but is easily influenced: the plant, Audrey II, tricks him into feeding it humans by simply showing his love interest's romantic troubles to his face, which he then immediately grows enraged over.
 Ellen Greene as Audrey, a kind, shy and awkward coworker who is the object of Seymour's affections, but who is dating the sadistic Orin Scrivello. Greene reprises her role from the original theatrical production.
 Vincent Gardenia as Mr. Mushnik, the grumpy, stingy owner of Mushnik's Flower Shop.
 Steve Martin as Orin Scrivello, DDS, a sadistic, nitrous oxide-addicted dentist and Audrey's violent, abusive boyfriend.
 Levi Stubbs as the voice of Audrey II, an evil and boisterous flytrap-like extraterrestrial plant that feeds on human blood and seeks world domination.
 Anthony Asbury, Brian Henson, Mak Wilson, Robert Tygner, Sue Dacre, David Barclay, Marcus Clarke, Paul Springer, David Greenaway, Toby Philpott, Michael Bayliss, Michael Barclay, Don Austen, Chris Leith, William Todd-Jones, Terry Lee, Ian Tregonning, John Alexander, Michael Quinn, James Barton and Graham Fletcher were all principal puppeteers for Audrey II.
 Tichina Arnold, Michelle Weeks, and Tisha Campbell as Crystal, Ronette, and Chiffon, the three mysterious girls who act as a Greek chorus and often provide back-up to the songs throughout the film.
 Jim Belushi as Patrick Martin, a Licensing and Marketing executive from World Botanical Enterprises who offers Seymour a proposal to sell Audrey II's worldwide. Belushi appears in the theatrical release after re-shoots, as actor Paul Dooley (who played Martin in the original ending) was unavailable to reprise his scenes for the re-shoots.
 John Candy as Wink Wilkinson, the DJ for WSKID who puts on a radio show about "weird stuff" called "Wink Wilkinson's Weird World".
 Christopher Guest as The First Customer, the first customer to enter the flower shop and notice Audrey II.
 Bill Murray as Arthur Denton, a hyperactive masochist who visits Orin the dentist for "a long, slow root canal." His character is not part of the stage play, but is based on Wilbur Force, a character from the original 1960 film played by then-young breakout Jack Nicholson.
 Miriam Margolyes as a Dental Nurse, Orin's cynical nurse/secretary whom Orin frequently appears to enjoy hurting.
 Stanley Jones as the Narrator, whose voice is heard reading the opening words.
 Mak Wilson, Danny John-Jules, Danny Cunningham, Gary Palmer and Paul Swaby as the doo-wop backup singers.
 Heather Henson (daughter of Jim Henson) cameos as one of Orin's patients.
 Vincent Wong as the Chinese Florist 
 Kerry Shale as Life magazine assistant
 Bertice Reading as 'Downtown' Old Woman

Musical numbers
 "Prologue: Little Shop of Horrors" – Chiffon, Ronette, Crystal
 "Skid Row (Downtown)" – Seymour, Audrey, Mushnik, Chiffon, Ronette, Crystal, Company
 "Da-Doo" – Seymour, Chiffon, Ronette, Crystal
 "Grow for Me" – Seymour, Chiffon, Ronette, Crystal (off-screen)
 "Somewhere That's Green" – Audrey
 "Some Fun Now" – Chiffon, Ronette, Crystal
 "Dentist!" – Orin, Chiffon, Ronette, Crystal
 "Feed Me (Git It!)" – Audrey II, Seymour
 "Suddenly, Seymour" – Seymour, Audrey, Chiffon, Ronette, Crystal
 "Suppertime" – Audrey II, Chiffon, Ronette, Crystal
 "The Meek Shall Inherit" – Chiffon, Ronette, Crystal, Company
 "Suppertime II" – Audrey II, Audrey, Chiffon, Ronette and Crystal (off-screen)
 "Suddenly, Seymour" (reprise) – Audrey, Seymour
 "Mean Green Mother from Outer Space" – Audrey II, the Pods
 "Little Shop of Horrors medley" (end credits) – Company

Original ending
"Somewhere That's Green" (reprise) – Audrey, Seymour
 "Mean Green Mother from Outer Space" – Audrey II, the Pods
 "Finale (Don't Feed the Plants)" – Chiffon, Ronette, Crystal, Company
 "Little Shop of Horrors medley" (end credits) – Company

Soundtrack

Charts

Production

Development
David Geffen was one of the original producers of the off-Broadway show and he began planning to produce a feature film adaptation. Originally Steven Spielberg was attached to serve as an Executive producer with Martin Scorsese attached to direct the film, which he wanted to shoot in 3D, but production was stalled when a lawsuit was filed by the original film's screenwriter and actor, Charles B. Griffith.  John Landis was also attached to the project for a time. Music producer and Four Seasons member Bob Gaudio adapted and produced the musical's songs for the film.

Geffen then offered the film to Frank Oz, who was finishing work on The Muppets Take Manhattan around the same time. Oz initially rejected it, but later had an idea that interested him in the cinematic aspect of the project. Oz spent a month and a half restructuring the script which he felt was stage-bound. Geffen and Ashman liked what he had written and decided to run with it. Oz was also studying the Off-Broadway show and how it was thematically constructed, in order to reconstruct it for a feature film.

The film differs only slightly from the stage play. The title song is expanded to include an additional verse to allow for the opening credits. The song "Ya Never Know" was rewritten into a calypso-inspired song called "Some Fun Now", although some of the lyrics were retained.  Four other songs ("Closed for Renovation", "Mushnik and Son", "Now [It's Just the Gas]", as well as "Call Back in the Morning") were cut from the original production score, and "Finale (Don't Feed the Plants)" does not appear in the theatrical version of the film. A new song, "Mean Green Mother from Outer Space", was written by Ashman and Menken for the film.

Casting
Greene was not the first choice for the role of Audrey. The studio wanted Cyndi Lauper, who turned it down. Barbra Streisand was also rumored to have been offered the part. Since Greene was the original off-Broadway Audrey, the role was given to her. "She's amazing," Oz said. "I couldn't imagine any other Audrey, really. She nailed that part for years off-Broadway." The character of the masochistic dental patient (who in Corman's original film was named Wilbur Force and played by Jack Nicholson) was cut from the stage version but added back to the new film, renamed Arthur Denton, and played by Bill Murray, who improvised all of his dialogue. It supposedly took Steve Martin six weeks to film all his scenes as Orin. He contributed ideas such as socking the nurse in the face (originally he was to knock her out using his motorbike helmet) and ripping off the doll head.

Filming
All the scenes were filmed at Pinewood Studios in England, making use of every sound stage there, including the 007 Stage. Oz and his crew did not want to shoot on location as it would tamper with the fantastical mood of the film. Part of the giant 007 stage was used to film the "Suddenly Seymour" number. But because of its size, the stage was impractical to heat properly and thus caused breath condensation to appear from the actor's lips. This was countered by having Ellen Greene and Rick Moranis put ice cubes in their mouths.

This would be the first time Moranis and Steve Martin starred in a film together, and they would later appear together in three more films: Parenthood, My Blue Heaven and L.A. Story.

As mentioned, additional sequences and songs from the original off-Broadway show were dropped or re-written in order for the feature version to be paced well. The notable change was for the "Meek Shall Inherit" sequence. As originally filmed, it detailed through a dream sequence Seymour's rising success and the need to keep the plant fed and impress Audrey. In the final cut, the dream sequence and much of the song is cut out. Oz said, "I cut that because I felt it just didn't work and that was before the first preview in San Jose. It was the right choice, it didn't really add value to the entire cut." The full version of the song was included on the film's soundtrack album, as were the songs from the original ending. The sequence was deemed to be lost until in 2012 when it was rediscovered on a VHS workprint that contained alternate and extended takes and sequences.

Operating the plant
The film's version of Audrey II was an elaborate creation, using puppets designed by Lyle Conway, who had previously worked with Oz on The Muppet Show, The Dark Crystal, and The Great Muppet Caper. The animatronic and fabrication team consisted of many of the same people who had worked on the creatures in Labyrinth.

While developing the mouth of the plant for the dialogue scenes and musical numbers, Oz, Conway and his crew struggled to figure out how to make the plant move convincingly. "We kept trying and trying and it didn't work." The solution presented itself while reviewing test footage of the puppet. When the film ran backwards or forward at a faster than normal speed, the footage looked more convincing and lifelike. They realized they could film the puppet at a slower speed, making it appear to move faster when played back at normal speed. "By slowing it down it looked it was talking real fast. We then went 'holy cow, look at that. We can do it. The frame rate for filming the plant was slowed to 12 or 16 frames per second, depending on the scene, and frequent screen cuts were used to minimize the amount of screen time the puppet spent with human actors; when interaction was necessary, the actors (usually Moranis) would pantomime and lip sync in slow motion. The film was then sped up to the normal 24 frames per second and voices were reinserted in post-production. Levi Stubbs' recordings were pitch-shifted through a Harmonizer when slowed down so that they were coherent for Moranis or Ellen Greene.

There are no blue screens or opticals involved in any of Audrey II's scenes, with the exception of the reshot ending where the plant is electrocuted, designed by Visual Effects supervisor Bran Ferren, and in some shots during the rampage in the original ending. The plant was made in six different stages of growth and there were three different versions of Mushnik's shop, making it possible for two units to work with different sized plants at the same time. Each of the talking plants had to be cleaned, re-painted and patched up at the end of each shooting day, which would take up to three hours depending on the size.  The "Suppertime" number uses two different sizes of Audrey II. When "Twoey" is singing all alone in the shop, it is actually a smaller size: the same size as when it sang "Feed Me", but now standing on a scaled down set to make it appear larger. The full size one that is seen to interact with Seymour and Mushnik was not provided with lip movement, but was built to swallow Mushnik's (mechanical) legs. Performing the plant in its largest form required around 60 puppeteers, many of whom had worked with director Frank Oz on previous projects, including The Dark Crystal, Labyrinth, and Return of the Jedi, and would go on to puppeteer in Who Framed Roger Rabbit and The Muppet Christmas Carol.

Original ending/Director's Cut ending
During production, director Oz shot a 23-minute ending based on the original off-Broadway musical's ending but even darker. However, after negative audience reaction at preview screenings, the ending was rewritten and re-shot for the theatrical release with a happier ending.

In the excised ending, as used in the director's cut, the plant attacks Audrey and reveals that it also ate Orin and Mr. Mushnik. Seymour pulls her from its jaws but is too late: she is mortally wounded. Seymour confesses that he fed Orin and Mushnik to the plant. Audrey asks Seymour to feed her to the plant too, so Seymour can earn the success he deserves, and, in a way, she'll always be with him ("Somewhere That's Green" (reprise)). After fulfilling her dying wish, he attempts suicide by jumping off the roof of a building, only to be stopped by Patrick Martin. Martin offers to propagate and sell Audrey IIs, saying he has already grown an Audrey II from a cutting he harvested earlier. Realizing Audrey II is planning global conquest, Seymour resolves to destroy the plant. In response, Audrey II tears down the shop, fishes Seymour from the rubble and eats him alive (“Mean Green Mother from Outer Space”). The plant spits out Seymour's glasses and laughs victoriously.

The three chorus girls appear in front of an American flag and tell how Audrey II buds became a worldwide craze, and grew into an army of monstrous plants that began to take over the Earth. Giant Audrey II plants are shown toppling buildings and destroying cities, as well as eating people. The United States Army fights the buds as they ascend the Statue of Liberty and Audrey II bursts through the movie screen ("Finale (Don't Feed the Plants)").

The finale

Oz and Ashman wanted to retain the ending of the musical where Seymour and Audrey die and the plant succeeds and takes over the city of New York, but Geffen was actually against it. "He said you can't do that", Oz recounts. "But again he knew what Howard and I wanted to do, so he supported us." A special effects team skilled in working with miniatures went to great lengths to create the finale. The model department was supervised by Richard Conway, known for his model work on Flash Gordon and Brazil. "It was all model stuff, that was the brilliant thing. He created the bridge, the buildings, several Audrey IIs and created all of it, all on tabletop. It's all old-fashioned, tabletop animation" (although no stop motion animation was used in the film or in the ending). The visual effects work was supervised by Bran Ferren (Altered States).

Reportedly the entire planned climax cost about $5 million to produce. Oz said in an interview, "this was, I think, the most expensive film Warner Bros. had done at the time." As the film was nearing completion, the excited studio set up a test screening in San Jose. Oz said, "For every musical number, there was applause, they loved it, it was just fantastic...  until Rick and Ellen died, and then the theatre became a refrigerator, an ice box. It was awful and the cards were just awful. You have to have a 55 percent 'recommend' to really be released and we got a 13. It was a complete disaster." Oz insisted on setting another test screening in L.A. to see if they would get a different reaction. Geffen agreed to this, but they received the same negative reaction as before. Oz later recounted, "I learned a lesson: in a stage play, you kill the leads and they come out for a bow—in a movie, they don't come out for a bow, they're dead. They're gone and so the audience lost the people they loved, as opposed to the theater audience where they knew the two people who played Audrey and Seymour were still alive. They loved those people, and they hated us for it."

Oz and Ashman scrapped Audrey and Seymour's grim deaths and the finale rampage, and Ashman rewrote a happier ending, with Jim Belushi replacing Paul Dooley (who was unavailable for the re-shoot) as Patrick Martin. The musical number "Mean Green Mother from Outer Space" was left mostly intact from the original cut, with new shots of Audrey observing from a window added in. A brief sequence from the "Mean Green Mother" number was also removed in which Seymour fires his revolver at Audrey II, only to discover that the bullets ricochet harmlessly off of the plant. In the happy ending, Audrey II is destroyed and Seymour, Audrey, and humanity survive. This happy ending is made somewhat ambiguous, however, with a final shot of a smiling Audrey II bud in Seymour and Audrey's front yard. Tisha Campbell was unavailable for the final appearance of the chorus girls in the yard and was replaced with a lookalike seen only from the waist down.

"We had to do it," Oz recounted. "[and do it] in such a manner that the audience would enjoy the movie. It was very dissatisfying for both of us that we couldn't do what we wanted. So creatively, no, it didn't satisfy us and being true to the story. But we also understood the realities that they couldn't release the movie if we had that ending." "We had to take [the workprint] apart, and we never made a dupe of [the original ending]." At the time, the only copies of it that were made to be viewed were VHS workprint tapes given to few crew members. The scene in which Seymour proposes to Audrey originally contained the reprise of "Suddenly, Seymour". This scene was re-shot and the reprise was placed later in the new ending. In the final theatrical cut, the only miniatures that are retained are the New York City streets passing behind Steve Martin's motorcycle ride at the beginning of "Dentist!" "When we did re-shoot the ending, the crowd reaction went over 50 percent in our favor. Before it was a point where they hated it so much, Warner probably wouldn't even release the movie", Oz said.

Release

Box office
Little Shop of Horrors, after a delay needed to complete the revised ending, was released on December 19, 1986, and was anticipated to do strong business over the 1986 holiday season. The film grossed $39 million at the box office, which, from the viewpoint of the studio, was considered an underperformer. However, it became a smash hit upon its home video release in 1987 on VHS and Beta.

Critical reception
Rotten Tomatoes retrospectively collected reviews to give it a score of 90% based on reviews from 51 critics, with an average rating of 7.37/10. The general consensus states: "Remixing Roger Corman's B-movie by way of the Off-Broadway musical, Little Shop of Horrors offers camp, horror and catchy tunes in equal measure—plus some inspired cameos by the likes of Steve Martin and Bill Murray." On Metacritic, which uses an average of critics' reviews, the film has an 81% rating based on 15 reviews, indicating "universal acclaim" (14 positive reviews, 1 mixed, and no negative). Richard Corliss of Time magazine said, "You can try not liking this adaptation of the Off-Broadway musical hit -- it has no polish and a pushy way with a gag -- but the movie sneaks up on you, about as subtly as Audrey II." Audiences polled by CinemaScore gave the film an average grade of "A−" on an A+ to F scale.

In The New York Times, Janet Maslin called it "a full-blown movie musical, and quite a winning one". Roger Ebert said in his review: "All of the wonders of Little Shop of Horrors are accomplished with an offhand, casual charm. This is the kind of movie that cults are made of, and after Little Shop finishes its first run, I wouldn't be at all surprised to see it develop as one of those movies that fans want to include in their lives." Oz's friend and Muppet colleague Jim Henson praised the film and said "the lip sync on the plant in that film is just absolutely amazing."

Accolades

The film was nominated for two Academy Awards. "Mean Green Mother from Outer Space" was the first Oscar-nominated song to contain profanity in the lyrics and was the first to be sung by a villain (Audrey II). The film's other Academy Award nomination was for Best Visual Effects. Neither of these two Oscar nods yielded a victory.

Home media
Little Shop of Horrors was the first DVD to be recalled for content. In 1998, Warner Bros. released a special edition DVD that contained approximately 23 minutes of unfinished footage from Oz's original ending, although it was in black and white and was missing some sound, visual and special effects. Producer and rights owner David Geffen was not aware of this release until it made it to the stores. Geffen said, "They put out a black-and-white, un-scored, un-dubbed video copy of the original ending that looked like shit." As a result, the studio removed it from shelves in a matter of days and replaced it with a second edition that did not contain the extra material. Geffen wanted to theatrically re-release the film with the original ending intact. Geffen also claimed to have a color copy of the original ending, while the studio had lower quality, black and white duplicates as their own color print was destroyed in a studio fire years earlier. But Geffen had not known, until after the DVD was pulled, that the studio did not know there was a colored copy of the original ending in existence.

In November 2011, Oz held a Q&A session at the Museum of the Moving Image in Astoria, Queens during a Henson-themed exhibit. During the talk, he announced that the film would be released as a new special edition with the original ending restored. Warner Bros. reconstructed and restored the ending in an alternate edit, with re-discovered color negatives of the sequence and the help of production notes from Oz and others on the film's creative team. It was released on DVD and Blu-ray on October 9, 2012, with features returning from the original DVD. It was initially subtitled as "The Intended Cut", but changed to "The Director's Cut" once Oz began to support the release. The new edit was screened at the 50th New York Film Festival in the "Masterwork" line-up on September 29, 2012, alongside titles such as Laurence Olivier's Richard III and Michael Cimino's Heaven's Gate. Oz worried that the audience would react negatively at the 2012 screening; however, "the audience accepted Audrey and Seymour's deaths with applause and roared in glee during the plant rampage," says Oz.

Cancelled remake
In January 2020, Full Circle Cinema reported that a remake of the film was planned, with Taron Egerton in talks to play Seymour, Scarlett Johansson as Audrey and Billy Porter voicing Audrey II. The Hollywood Reporter affirmed in February that the film was being developed by Warner Bros. Pictures with Greg Berlanti directing and producing with Marc Platt and David Geffen, Porter confirmed, and Egerton and Johansson in negotiations. Additionally, Chris Evans was also in talks to play Dr. Scrivello. Matthew Robinson was to write the screenplay. As of May 2021, the remake had been postponed indefinitely, and in September 2022 it was announced that the remake had been cancelled.

See also
 List of films featuring eclipses

References

External links

 
 
 
 

Little Shop of Horrors
1986 films
1980s comedy horror films
1980s science fiction comedy films
1980s musical comedy films
1980s monster movies
American black comedy films
American comedy horror films
American science fiction comedy films
American monster movies
American musical comedy films
American rock musicals
American science fiction horror films
1980s English-language films
Films about dentistry
Films about plants
Films based on musicals
Films based on musicals based on films
Films directed by Frank Oz
Puppet films
Films set in the 1960s
Films set in New York City
Films shot at Pinewood Studios
The Geffen Film Company films
Musical film remakes
Science fiction musical films
Films with screenplays by Howard Ashman
Warner Bros. films
1986 comedy films
Films scored by Miles Goodman
Films scored by Alan Menken
Films produced by David Geffen
1980s American films